Myriam Raquel Hernández Navarro (born 2 May 1967) is a Chilean singer, songwriter and television presenter. She has dabbled mainly in romantic ballad, which is why she is sometimes nicknamed "La baladista de América" ("America's balladeer"), although she has also fused her style with other genres such as electronics or hip-hop.

She began her musical career in the late 1980s with her album Myriam Hernández and the single "El hombre que yo amo" that reached No. 10 on Billboard's Hot Latin Tracks in 1989, while her first album reached No. 4 on Billboard's Latin Pop Songs the same year. She has released nine studio albums, two live albums, five compilation albums, two DVDs and 39 singles, including duets with various artists from the Ibero-American music scene such as Marco Antonio Solís, Cristian Castro or Gilberto Santa Rosa.

She has sold more than 6 million records worldwide, making her one of the best-selling Chilean music artist of all time. Thirteen of her singles have entered Billboard's Hot Latin Songs chart, with "Peligroso amor" and "Te pareces tanto a él" reaching number one, while her album Dos reached the same position on the Latin Pop Albums chart. On the Latin Pop Songs chart, "Huele a Peligro" and "Ese hombre" also reached number one.

In 2011, she was nominated for a Latin Grammy Award for Best Female Pop Vocal Album for her album Seducción and in 2015 she received the President's Merit Award from the Latin Recording Academy; in the same year she entered the Latin Songwriters Hall of Fame. In 2022, she received the Latin Grammy Lifetime Achievement Award, being the first female artist from her country to receive it.

She has also ventured into hosting and participating in various television programs in Chile, including sporadic participation as an actress. She co-animated the Viña del Mar International Song Festival between 2002 and 2006, while she has performed as an invited artist five times, receiving the highest awards.

Biography
Prior to begin its musical career, she made some television appeareances on a handful of TV shows, including "Generación joven" —at age 11— and "La Pandilla", both part of Televisión Nacional de Chile; also, she performed a small role in the soap opera "De cara al mañana", where she appeared in five episodes. 

In 1982, as a solo artist, she entered into the "Ranking Juvenil" (Juvenile Ranking) of Canal 13's "Sábados Gigantes" program, hosted by Don Francisco. At 18 she was named Artista Revelación (Best New Artist) by the Chilean press before having even recorded a single album.

In October 1988, Hernández released her first album under record label EMI entitled "Myriam Hernández". In Chile the record got her the Disco de Oro, and would later go quadruple platinum in – among other countries – the United States, Colombia, Peru, Ecuador, Bolivia, Puerto Rico, Costa Rica, and Panama. Thus began her international career. Two tracks on this album, "Ay Amor" (Oh My Love) and "El Hombre que Yo Amo" (The Man I Love), spent months at the top of music charts in Latin America and the U.S. In February 1989 she was a guest artist and jury member at the Festival de Viña del Mar.

In 1989, the Asociación de Periodistas de Espectáculos de Chile awarded Hernández the APES award for Best Female Performer and her album received the Mejor Producción Discográfica (Best Record) award. In July 1989, Billboard's Hot Latin scored her first success with "El Hombre que Yo Amo," and soon after in December her album was among the 10 best selling albums in the Latin world.

In Los Angeles in April 1989, Hernández began recording a second album, produced by Humberto Gatica, and on which collaborated David Foster, Jason Scheff (Chicago Group) and Lucho Gatica as executive producer. Noteworthy songs included "Te Pareces Tanto a Él" (You Look so much like Him), "Tonto" (Fool), "Mío" (Mine), "Peligroso Amor" (Dangerous Love), and "Herida" (Hurt, composed by Myriam Hernández). The album remained on the Billboard charts from May 1990 to July 1991, with "Peligroso Amor" occupying the No. 1 spot for several weeks, followed by "Te Pareces Tanto a Él" and "Herida." This album held the No. 1 spot for Top Latin Albums for a record 18 consecutive weeks. "Peligroso Amor," whose video, produced by Luis de Lllano (Televisa-Mexico), was nominated for Billboard magazine's Best Latin Video.

Once again in 1991 Hernández was invited to the Viña del Mar International Song Festival where she received both the Antorcha and Gaviota de Plata awards. In Los Angeles in 1992 she recorded her third album produced by Spaniard Juan Carlos Calderón and mixed by Humberto Gatica. All the songs were written by Juan Carlos Calderón, with the exception of "Mira" (Look), co-written by Myriam and Juan Carlos. The album's hits were "Un Hombre Secreto" (A Secret Man), "Se Me Fue" (Gone), and "Si no Fueras Tú" (If You Weren't You). The album went Gold and Platinum in the US, Mexico, Central America, Venezuela, Colombia, Ecuador, Peru, and Chile. She also released albums in Japan, Thailand, Taiwan, and the United Arab Emirates.

In May 1992, Hernández performed at the Acapulco Festival, accompanied on the piano by Juan Carlos Calderón. The video for the song "Se me fue" was filmed in Los Angeles and was directed by U.S.-based Argentine director Gustavo Garzón.

Also in 1992, Hernández began a new project by founding the "School of Vocal Arts" along with her voice instructor, speech therapist Ricardo Álvarez. Among the professional artists to have gone through this school are Beto Cuevas, Lucybell, and Kudai. Her fourth album, released in 1994, was also produced in Los Angeles where she worked again with producer Humberto Gatica. From this album the song "Ese Hombre" (That Man), by Chilean songwriter María Angélica Ramírez, won ASCAP's "Best Pop Ballad" of the year, as well as first place on the Billboard charts. In 1996, artist Paul Anka invited her to collaborate on an album of all-time Spanish hits called "Amigos" (Friends), on which they performed together the song "Tu Cabeza en Mi Hombro" (a Spanglish cover of Put Your Head on My Shoulder). Figures such as Céline Dion, Ricky Martin, Julio Iglesias, and Juan Gabriel also collaborated on that album, which was released by Sony.

In 1998, Hernández released "Todo el Amor" (All the Love), her newest and fifth album. Produced by Humberto Gatica and achieving success in all Spanish-language markets, including once again the United States, where the first single, "Huele a Peligro" (It Smells Like Danger), by Armando Manzanero, quickly climbed to the first spot of Billboard magazine's Hot Latin Tracks. It also included hits such as "Deseo" (I Wish), by Mónica Naranjo, and "La Fuerza del Amor" (The Strength of Love), by Estéfano. The music video for the song "Huele a Peligro" was directed in Chile by director Germán Bobe.

In 1998 Hernández was a guest on the Chilean program "Gigante y Ud.," along with Don Francisco, for two months. In the June 1999 issue of People En Español she was elected one of 25 Latin beauties, together with Ricky Martin and Spanish actor Antonio Banderas. In 2000 she released "+ y Más" (+ and More) with a large selection of producers and authors such as Kike Santander, Rudy Perez, Estéfano, Humberto Gatica, and Lester Mendez. Notable songs included "Mañana" (Tomorrow), "Quién Cuidará de Mí" (Who Will Take Care of Me), "Si yo me Vuelvo a Enamorar" (If I fall in love again), and "Leña y Fuego" (Wood and Fire). The record went Gold and Platinum in various Latin American countries. The video for the song "Quién Cuidará de Mí" was directed by Mexican director Carlos Markovic. In February 2001, at the Viña del Mar International Song Festival, she was awarded the Gaviota de Plata and Gaviota de Oro (Silver and Golden Seagulls) by the public.

In October 2001 Hernández gave two concerts at Santiago de Chile's Municipal Theater, a recording of which, "El Amor en Concierto" The Love at Concert, was released in Chile where it went Gold and Platinum. Based in Miami since 2000, she decided to make a foray into designer modeling photography for Italian brand Santini Mavardi and also agreed for the first time to associate her name with a commercial brand and act in an ad campaign for Procter & Gamble's "Head & Shoulders."

In 2002, Hernández debuted as host of the Viña del Mar International Song Festival, a competition held every year in Chile and in which she participated until 2006 alongside entertainers Antonio Vodanovic, Ricardo Montaner, and Sergio Lagos. She became the only woman to host for 25 nights with 3 different entertainers. She also was an entertainer on Chilean television programs such as "La Movida del Festival," "Con Mucho Cariño," "Protagonistas de la Música," and "La Noche del Mundial."

In 2004, Hernández released Huellas (Traces), a collection of her greatest hits including three never before-released songs. Armando Manzanero composed a new hit for her, "No te He Robado Nada" (I Took Nothing From You), and Myriam Hernández and her son Jorge Ignacio, then only eight, composed the song "He Vuelto por Ti" (I Have Come Back for You). The album included a new version of the song "Mio" recorded with Argentine group Los Nocheros as well as the song "El Amor de mi Vida" (The Love of my Life) (written by Myriam and Chilean hip-hop band Los Tetas) recorded with that band. Huellas was released across Latin America and went Gold and Platinum. She also released her first DVD. At the end of 2005 she produced her first DVD-CD of a live performance entitled Contigo en Concierto (With You in Concert).

In 2007, Hernández released the covers' album Enamorándome (Falling in Love). In February 2010 Myriam sang "Rescátame" in Festival Antofagasta Junto al Mar. This song will be appear in her new album.

Discography

Studio albums
 1988: Myriam Hernández I
 1990: Dos
 1992: Myriam Hernández III
 1994: Myriam Hernández IV
 1998: Todo el amor
 2000: + y Más
 2004: Huellas
 2007: Enamorándome
 2011: Seducción
 2022: Sinergia

Live albums
 2001: El Amor En Concierto
 2005: Contigo En Concierto
 2008: The Best of the Best (DVD only)

Compilation albums
 1992: Todo Lo Mío
 1996: Éxitos y Recuerdos
 1997: Todo Lo Mío
 1998: Simplemente Humana

References

External links
 Billboard.com (history in Billboard magazine website).
 [ All Music.com]

1965 births
Living people
20th-century Chilean women singers
Chilean pop singers
Chilean singer-songwriters
Chilean television presenters
Singers from Santiago
Latin music songwriters
Chilean women television presenters
Women in Latin music
Chilean television personalities
Latin Grammy Lifetime Achievement Award winners